The British Rail Class 730 Aventra is a type of electric multiple-unit passenger train designed by Bombardier Transportation and built by Alstom for West Midlands Trains. Two separate batches of the fleet will be built; 48 three-car units and 36 five-car units.

History
At the time the franchise was awarded, the company announced that it would procure more than 100 new trains at a cost of £680m to replace older rolling stock and enhance its fleet. Of these, a total of 81 EMUs were ordered from Bombardier Transportation from its Aventra product range. They are being built at Derby Litchurch Lane Works. The first completed train was unveiled in September 2020.

In 2022 the order was amended to increase the proportion of three-car units in the fleet, which will result in the delivery of 48 three-car units and 36 five-car units instead of the original plan for 36 three-car units and 45 five-car units.

Testing and introduction into service 
The Class 730 was tested in Velim in the Czech Republic, as well as in the UK. They will enter service in early 2023 and will be the second new West Midlands Railway fleet to be introduced, with first being the Class 196 which entered service on 17 October 2022. The introduction of these trains will allow the Class 323s to be withdrawn with 17 sets being cascaded to Northern Trains. It will also ensure the withdrawal of the Class 350/2 units on the West Midlands Trains network.

Testing of Class 730 units on the West Midlands Trains network began in March 2021, and in February 2022 the 36 Class 730/0 units received authorisation for service from the Office of Rail and Road.

The Class 730/0 units will enter service on West Coast Main Line services out of London allowing for the withdraw of Class 319s, before entering service on the Cross City line in the first half of 2024.

Fleet
The two separate batches will be constructed to operate at different maximum speeds to suit different uses.

References

External links

Bombardier Transportation multiple units
730
Train-related introductions in 2023
25 kV AC multiple units